Hamarøya Mountain is an isolated ice-free mountain in the middle of the mouth of Vestreskorve Glacier in the Mühlig-Hofmann Mountains of Queen Maud Land, Antarctica. It was mapped from surveys and air photos by the Sixth Norwegian Antarctic Expedition (1956–60) and named Hamarøya (the hammer island).

References

Mountains of Queen Maud Land
Princess Martha Coast